In palaeography, a minim is a short, vertical stroke used in handwriting. The word is derived from the Latin minimum, meaning least or smallest.

A minim is the basic stroke for the letters i, m, n, and u in uncial script and later scripts deriving from it. Parts of other letters are based on minims as well: when a minim is extended above the line, it becomes an ascender, as in the letters d and b, and when it is extended below the line, it becomes a descender, as in the letters p and q. It is a stem when it forms only part of a letter, such as r.

Minims often have a connecting stroke which makes it clear that they form an m, n, etc.; however, in Gothic scripts, also known as  especially in late examples, minims may connect to each other with only a hair line stroke making it difficult for modern readers to tell what letter is meant. A 13th-century example of this is:  ("the smallest mimes of the gods of snow do not wish at all in their life that the great duty of the defences of the wine be diminished"). In Gothic script this would look almost like a series of single strokes (this problem eventually led to a dotted  and separate letters  and ).

The resulting spellings have persisted into modern times in words such as come, honey, and love, where an o stands for a short ŭ.

, literally "textualis without feet", has minims with no finials at all, while  has round finials.

References

Palaeography